Soledad International Airport was the main airport of Barranquilla, Colombia from 1936 to 1981, when it was replaced by Ernesto Cortissoz International Airport.  It was the main international hub in the country from 1936 to 1959.

History 

In the early 1930s, SCADTA based its main hub at Veranillo Airport which was a seaplane port on the Magdalena River which had been operating since 1919, the year of the airline's inception.  The airline operated several Fokker Universals and Sikorsky S-38s from the main terminal at the seaplane port to many different parts of Colombia.  Since 1929, it had also been an important stopover point for Pan American World Airways, which operated Sikorsky S-42s to parts of Panama and Venezuela.  However, during this period SCADTA was expanding its fleet to land-based aircraft, such as Ford Trimotors and Boeing 247s and the current seaplane terminal could not accommodate the new aircraft.  In response to this, a new airport was planned by SCADTA to replace the seaplane terminal.  When it eventually opened, the old seaplane port was sold to the government to be used as a port for the Colombian Navy.

The new aerodrome opened in 1936, located in the municipality of Soledad, Atlántico.  It was thus named Soledad International Airport" The airport included a short paved runway, an office building, and a small terminal building.  The two airlines operating from the airport mainly used Boeing 247s and DC-2s.  By 1937, the airport was already busy, and there were too little facilities to deal with the newer aircraft.  In response to this, the airport's first hangar opened in 1938.  DC-3s had been gaining in popularity at the time, and in 1939 SCADTA acquired and began operating the type.  Pan Am also began flying DC-3s to the airport, and by the beginning of 1940, it became the first major air hub in the country.

By the summer of 1940, SCADTA had reorganized into Avianca, and Barranquilla became its first major hub.

Historical Airlines and Destinations

Passenger

Cargo

Accidents and incidents 
 On September 30, 1975, a Boeing 727 operated by Avianca Cargo crashed on final approach due to poor visibility.

References 

Airports in Colombia
Buildings and structures in Atlántico Department
Defunct airports
Airports established in 1936